David Cope (born May 17, 1941, in San Francisco, California) is an American author, composer, scientist, and former professor of music at the University of California, Santa Cruz (UCSC). His primary area of research involves artificial intelligence and music; he writes programs and algorithms that can analyze existing music and create new compositions in the style of the original input music. He taught a summer workshop in algorithmic computer music that was open to the public (but not free) as well as a general education course entitled Artificial Intelligence and Music for enrolled UCSC students. Cope is also co-founder and CTO Emeritus of Recombinant Inc., a music technology company.

Inventions
Cope is the inventor of US Patent #7696426 "Recombinant music composition algorithm and method of using the same".

Composition
His EMI (Experiments in Musical Intelligence) software has produced works in the style of various composers, some of which have been commercially recorded—ranging from short pieces to full-length operas.

His subsequent Emily Howell program models musical creativity based on the types of creativity outlined by Margaret Boden in her book The Creative Mind: Myths and Mechanisms.

As a composer, Cope's own work has encompassed a variety of styles—from the traditional to the avant-garde—and techniques, such as unconventional manners of playing, experimental musical instrument, and microtonal scales, including a 33-note system of just intonation he developed himself. Most recently, all of his original compositions have been written in collaboration with the computer—based on the input of his earlier works. He seeks synergy between composer creativity and computer algorithm as his principal creative direction.

Bibliography
Cope has published a wide range of books, which are often used as textbooks. New Directions in Music, first published in 1971, is currently in its 7th edition and is the standard text for contemporary music. In 2009, Cope was interviewed by the media in anticipation of the release of a CD containing music composed collaboratively by Cope and Emily Howell, a computer program.

Cope has also published a series of detective novels under a pseudonym.

Books
Cope, David (1991). Computers and Musical Style. Madison, Wisconsin: A-R Editions.
—— (1996). Experiments in Musical Intelligence. Madison, Wisconsin: A-R Editions.
—— (1997). Techniques of the Contemporary Composer. New York City: Schirmer Books. .
—— (2000). New Directions in Music, 7th ed. Prospect Heights, Illinois: Waveland Press. .
—— (2000). The Algorithmic Composer. Madison, Wisconsin: A-R Editions.
—— (2001). Virtual Music: Computer Synthesis of Musical Style. Cambridge, Massachusetts: The MIT Press. .
—— (2006). Computer Models of Musical Creativity. Cambridge, Massachusetts: MIT Press.
—— (2008). Hidden Structure: Music Analysis Using Computers. Madison, Wisconsin: A-R Editions. .
—— (2012). A Musicianship Primer San Francisco. Epoc Books. .

Chapters

1992. "A Computer Model of Music Composition." In Machine Models of Music, Stephan Schwanauer and David Levitt, eds.: MIT Press.
1992. "On the Algorithmic Representation of Musical Style." In Musical Intelligence, M. Balaban, K. Ebcioglu, and O. Laske, eds. : AAAI Press.
1998. "Signatures and Earmarks: Computer Recognition of Patterns in Music." In Melodic Similarity, Concepts, Procedures, and Applications. Walter B. Hewlett and Eleanor Selfridge-Field (eds.). Cambridge, Massachusetts: MIT Press.

Articles
1987. "Experiments in Music Intelligence." In Proceedings of the International Computer Music Conference, San Francisco: Computer Music Association.
1987. "An Expert System for Computer-Assisted Music Composition." Computer Music Journal 11,4 (Winter): 30–46.
1988. "Music and LISP." AI Expert 3,3 (March): 26–34.
1988. "Music: The Universal Language." In Proceedings of the First Workshop on AI and Music. Minneapolis/St. Paul, Minnesota: AAAI: 87–98.
1989. "Experiments in Musical Intelligence (EMI): Non-Linear Linguistic-based Composition." Interface, vol. 18: 117–139.
1990. "Pattern Matching as an Engine for the Computer Simulation of Musical Style." In Proceedings of the 1990 ICMC. San Fran Computer Music Association
1991. "Recombinant Music." COMPUTER. (July).
1991. "Computer Simulations of Musical Style." Computers in Music Research, The Queens University of Belfast, 7–10 (April): 15–17.
1992. "Computer Modeling of Musical Intelligence in Experiments in Musical Intelligence." Computer Music Journal 16,2 (Summer): 69–83.
1993. "Virtual Music." Electronic Musician, 9:5 (May): 80–85.
1996. "Mimesis du style et de la structure musicale." Symposium on Composition, Modelisation et Ordinateur. IRCAM, Paris: 21–23.
1997. "Composer's Underscoring Environment." In Proceedings of the International Computer Music Conference. San Fran: Computer Music Association.
1997. "The Composer's Underscoring Environment: CUE." Computer Music Journal 21/3 (Fall).
1999. "One Approach to Musical Intelligence." IEEE Intelligent Systems. Los Alamitos, California: IEEE Computer Society (14/3, May/June).
2000. "Facing the Music: Perspectives on Machine Composed Music." Leonardo Music Journal 9: 79–87.
2002. "Computer Analysis and Composition Using Atonal Voice-Leading Techniques." Perspectives of New Music 40/1 (Winter): 121–146.
2003. "Computer Analysis of Musical Allusions." Computer Music Journal 27/1: 11–28.
2004. " A Musical Learning Algorithm." Computer Music Journal 28/3: 12–27.
2006. "The Vivaldi Code" Wired, issue 14. September 9, 2006.

Discography

1993. Bach by Design. Centaur Records. CRC 2184
1997. Classical Music Composed by Computer. Centaur Records. CRC 2329
1997. Virtual Mozart. Centaur Records. CRC 2452
1999. Towers. Vienna Modern Masters. VMM 2024
2003. Virtual Bach. Centaur Records. CRC 2619
2009. From Darkness, Light (Emily Howell). Centaur Records. CRC 3023
2011. Symphony No. 4. Epoc. B008J5IK78
2012. Symphony No. 5. Epoc. B008J5IFD2
2012. Symphony No. 9 "(Martin Luther King, Jr.)" Epoc. B008J5IGCW
2012. String Quartets 5 and 6. Epoc. B008O9RZTS
2012. Violin Concerto/Viola Concerto. Epoc. B008J5IGRC
2012. Cello Concerto/Octet for Strings. Epoc. B008K8VJM2
2012. Piano Concerto/Re-Birth/Transcendence. Epoc. B008PYPDUK

See also
Algorithmic composition
Computer-generated music
List of music software

References

Sources

Further reading
 Ball, Philip. 2012. "Iamus, Classical Music's Computer Composer, Live from Malaga", The Guardian (July 1, 2014); accessed August 5, 2014.

External links
 music.ucsc.edu – Faculty: David Cope
 
 David Cope profile
 Recombinant Inc website
 Ryan Blitstein. Triumph of the Cyborg Composer, Pacific Standard
 "Musical DNA" segment from NPR Radiolab program, September 25, 2007

1941 births
Living people
American classical composers
American male classical composers
Artificial intelligence researchers
University of California, Santa Cruz faculty
Writers from San Francisco
21st-century classical composers
21st-century American composers
21st-century American male musicians
Centaur Records artists